Dalwhinnie (Scottish Gaelic: Dail Chuinnidh "meeting place") is a small village in the Scottish Highlands. Dalwhinnie is located at the head of Glen Truim and the north-east end of Loch Ericht, on the western edge of the Cairngorms National Park.

Location

It is north of Drumochter, just off the A9 road from Perth to Inverness and has been bypassed since 1975. Dalwhinnie railway station lies on the Highland Main Line from Perth to Inverness.

Tourism
The area is walking destination along the River Truim and in Cairngorm and Monadhliath Mountains in the Cairngorm National Park.

Dalwhinnie is on the Sustrans National Cycle Route 7, Glasgow to Inverness. There are several cycle routes in the area including one alongside Loch Ericht.

Loch Ericht Hotel stands on the banks of the River Truim.

Distillery
Diageo owns the local distillery, the highest-elevation working distillery in Scotland.  Dalwhinnie Single Malt is a light, heathery whisky.

Climate
Dalwhinnie experiences a subpolar oceanic climate (Cfc) that very closely borders a humid continental climate (Dfb) with strong influences of an oceanic climate (Cfb), a climate very rare for a UK town.

Skies are frequently overcast with cool temperatures and rainfall throughout the year. Sunshine here averages only 1,032 hours, which is one of the lowest in the United Kingdom.

Dalwhinnie holds the UK low temperature records for the months of June, September and October.

For the 1951–1980 observation period, it averaged a temperature of  compared to Braemar's , making Dalwhinnie one of the coldest inhabited places in the British Isles.

The lowest temperatures in recent years have been  in January 2010 and  during December 2010. Winter snowfall can be heavy, with accumulations often exceeding .

See also
 Centre points of the United Kingdom
 Battle of Invernahavon - the remnants of a party of Clan Cameron raiders escaped via Dalwhinnie after their defeat by the Chattan Confederation south west of Newtonmore in this 14th century battle.

References

External links
Newtonmore Riding Centre Website
Forestry Commission Scotland. Wolftrax Mountain Biking Centre Link
Dalwhinnie Voices

Populated places in Badenoch and Strathspey